Victor Shabangu (18 January 1970 – 16 June 2018) was a Swazi athlete. He competed in the men's long jump at the 1996 Summer Olympics.

References

External links
 

1970 births
2018 deaths
Athletes (track and field) at the 1996 Summer Olympics
Swazi male long jumpers
Olympic athletes of Eswatini
World Athletics Championships athletes for Eswatini
Place of birth missing